Joe Bartnick is an American comedian, actor, and writer.

Early life
Bartnick was born and raised in Pittsburgh, Pennsylvania. He lived in the  
South Hills and Bethel Park, and graduated from Seton-La Salle Catholic High School.

Career
Bartnick moved to San Francisco and began his career as a stand-up comedian in 1997. He started performing in coffee shops and laundromats, and eventually went on to play venues such as Madison Square Garden, The Chicago Theater, The Warfield, the Punch Line, and the Palace of Fine Arts. During that time, he became a regular at The Punchline comedy club and shared the stage with comedians such as Dave Attell, Bill Burr, Dave Chappelle, and Robin Williams.

In 2006, Bartnick moved to Los Angeles and began writing and acting. He has written for many television projects including Dogg After Dark and Eddie Griffin: Going For Broke. As an actor, he starred in Dirty Jokes the Movie. He created and starred in the series King of Clubs. He roasted Tommy Lee on Lee's show Battleground Earth. In 2011, he published the best-selling E-book You Might Be a Douchebag. Since 2008, he has traveled the world opening for Lisa Lampanelli. In 2012, he began producing content for the National Hockey League Players' Association. Also in 2012, he released the CD Salute! Recorded in San Francisco.

Joe Bartnick is the co-host and creator of the podcast PuckOff and can be heard weekly talking all things hockey.

References

American stand-up comedians
American comedy writers
Comedians from Pennsylvania
Living people
Year of birth missing (living people)